Agile Communication Environment (ACE) is a software product developed by Avaya. It uses a service-oriented architecture (SOA) and web services to integrate unified communications capabilities with business applications and processes.

History
Development started in 2005 by a group from Nortel's Maidenhead R&D center, developing a prototype unified communications application server.
The product was officially announced at a joint Nortel/IBM event in New York and rebranded as Agile Communication Environment.
 Version 3.0.3 was released August 2012.

See also
Unified communications
Service-oriented architecture
Web service

References

External links
 "Nortel to Showcase New Unified Communications Capabilities at VoiceCon 2009"
 "Nortel Brings Unified Communications to Life at Unified Communications Expo 2009"
 IBM PartnerWorld > Global Solutions Directory > Agile Communications Environment
 "World's Local Bank" HSBC Deploys Nortel Unified Communications Solution

Avaya
Nortel products
Service-oriented architecture-related products